Anastathes parva is a species of beetle in the family Cerambycidae. It was described by Gressitt in 1935. It is known from China and Vietnam.

References

Astathini
Beetles described in 1935